Leven Brown (born 14 August 1972) is a British Ocean Rower who has held five Guinness World Records. He along with his crew Don Lennox, Livar Nysted and Ray Carroll also held the world record for "longest distance rowed in 24h in an ocean rowing boat" at 118 miles, is the first and thus far only in the sport ever to have held North and 'Trade Winds' (Mid Atlantic) speed records simultaneously and to hold two speed records over two separate oceans (North Atlantic and Indian Ocean)  Brown was brought up on a landlocked farm in his native Scottish Borders but was introduced to the ocean at an early age where he discovered ocean rowing. After a career with Brewin Dolphin Securities that spanned 17 years he did his first Ocean Row in 2005.

2005 First Expedition 'The Columbus Run' Cadiz - Tobago
 
On the first expedition Brown set off solo on 14 August 2005 on a journey. He spent a total of 123 days at sea and covered 4278 miles. There were four named storms on Brown's first voyage: Vince, Delta, Epsilon and Zeta. 2005 was the busiest hurricane season on record.  Brown supported 'The Sportsman's Charity' and the Edinburgh 'One City Trust' on this voyage. Brown received a Guinness world record for being the first person to row from mainland Spain to the West Indies.

2007/8 Mid Atlantic - Gran Canaria - Barbados Expedition - speed record 
2007/8 - Brown's second voyage was as skipper with a 14-man crew on a 50 ft ocean rowing boat called La Mondiale. He and his crew rowed 3000 miles from Gran Canaria to Barbados in 33 days 7 hours 30 minutes beating the record of that time.  Several charities were represented by the crew. The previous record was set by a French team in 1992 of 35 days 8 hours 30 minutes in the same boat.

2009 Mid Atlantic - Gran Canaria - Barbados Expedition - speed record attempt
2009 - The third voyage in La Mondiale was cut short by the irreparable damage to the rudder after a collision with an unknown submerged object. The 14 crew were evacuated safely onto a passing ship Island Ranger but the boat was lost presumed sunk some 1000 miles from the Canary Islands. Several charities were represented by the crew.

2010 North Atlantic USA, New York -  Isles of Scilly, UK Expedition - speed record 
2010 - The North Atlantic, Brown's fourth voyage. As skipper he picked his crew, all of which he had rowed oceans with before, Don Lennox (Scotland), Livar Nysted (Faroe Islands), Ray Carroll (Ireland). They were attempting to beat the long-standing North Atlantic speed record set in 1896 by Norwegians Frank Samuelsen and George Harbo which had stood at 55 days 7 hours for some 114 years. Their boat Artemis Investments left New York City on 17 June 2010 and arrived in St Mary's on 31 July 2010 in a time of 43 days 21 hours 26 minutes and 48 seconds. Which remains the record to date for the North Atlantic. During their voyage they were capsized twice in storms.

2013 Mid Atlantic Gran Canaria -  Barbados Expedition - speed record attempt - maiden voyage Avalon 
2013 - The Trade Winds Route, Puerto Mogan, Gran Canaria to Port St Charles, Barbados, 3000 miles. Leven Brown skippered his new ocean rowing racing boat Avalon, with a crew of eight. He set the fastest team time that year narrowly beating rival boat Titan. Brown's time was 35 days 12 hours 41 minutes.  Several charities were represented by the crew.

2014 Geraldton, Australia - Seychelles, Africa Expedition - speed record - Indian Ocean

2014 - The Indian Ocean - 4579 Miles Rowed From Geraldton, Australia to Victoria, Mahe, Seychelles. Crew of seven. Brown's first mixed crew. Set two more world records - Speed record across the Indian Ocean 57 days 10 hours 58 minutes - with an average speed of 2.65 knots. Brown's original intention was to go for Durban, South Africa however early in the voyage a set of three storms knocked them too far north to make this landfall. They then changed course to head for Mombasa in Kenya but owing to rising terrorism the British Foreign and Commonwealth Office recommended no travel to Kenya. They then changed course and landed on the Seychelles. Brown had to evacuate Dr Shane Usher due to him being severely burned by boiling water mid ocean reducing the crew down to six. A critical steering cable broke on Avalon which forced the crew to manually steer the boat which reduced the rowing deck down to two rowers per shift - half what it is meant to be. On the way into the Seychelles they had an incident with a suspected pirate vessel. Brown bluffed that they were in fact a Royal Navy 'Q' boat and that they were rendezvousing with their frigate in 30 minutes. The suspected pirate vessel then fled. This was called his 'Captain Phillips' moment. Brown supported Save the Elephants as a charity.

2015 Mid Atlantic Gran Canaria -  Barbados Expedition - speed record attempt - boat Avalon 
2015 - The Trade Winds Route, Puerto Mogan, Gran Canaria to Port St Charles, Barbados, 3000 miles. Leven Brown Skippered Ocean Rowing racing boat Avalon again, with a crew of eight. Six men and two women including Thato Mabelane who became the first African woman to row an ocean. It was the most international crew Brown had Skippered containing five nationalities including South Africa, Brazilian, Irish, English, and Scots. The crossing was marred by steering failure again within the first 24 hours but they managed to manually steer for the entire course. The boat's rudder was attacked by a great white shark estimated to be 4 – 5 m in length. There was little damage. The Voyage took 43days 12hours 55 mins. In the final approach the Avalon was blown out to sea by gale force winds 2 miles from Port St Charles, Barbados and was towed into calmer waters to finish. The crew rowed circa 3250 miles. Leven Brown became only the second man in history to cross two different oceans in a rowing boat within a year - the first being his great friend, fellow rower and teammate Livar Nysted - Brown did the Indian Ocean In June 2014 and the Atlantic in January 2015. Brown again supported the 'Save the Elephants' charity.

Other information
Brown is a fully qualified RYA/MCA yachtmaster and runs his own expedition and rowing services company as well as undertaking yacht deliveries throughout the world. Leven was nominated for the National Geographic Adventurer Awards and was nominated for a Glenfiddich Spirit of Scotland Award as well as being awarded the Freedom of the City of Edinburgh for his achievements.

References

1972 births
Living people
Sportspeople from the Scottish Borders
Ocean rowers
Scottish male rowers